Manuel Andrés González (17 March 1930 – 1 September 2013) was a Spanish writer and actor known for his role as Julián Pastor in the TV series La que se avecina.

In 1954 he played Rosas de otoño, by Jacinto Benavente, with Irene López Heredia in Madrid. His biggest important role at stage were La viuda valenciana (1960), and El anzuelo de Fenisa (1961), both by Lope de Vega; De pronto, una noche... (1964), by Alfonso Paso; and La fiaca (1994), by Ricardo Talesnik.

In 2009 he was awarded by the Premio Especial Tirant (2009).

He died on 1 September 2013 after suffering a respiratory failure at aged 83.

Filmography

Films

Television

Short films

Miniseries
 1995 – La Regenta

References

External links
 

1930 births
2013 deaths
Spanish male stage actors
Spanish male television actors
Spanish male voice actors
Spanish male film actors
Deaths from respiratory failure